Andrew Suniula (born 1 May 1982) is a former rugby football player who played rugby union as a centre for the United States national team (USA Eagles XV's). He last played for the Austin Gilgronis and is now their Rugby Operations Director and a member of the coaching staff.

Early years
Suniula began playing professional rugby union with Taranaki during the 2005–06 season, playing in eight times for the club.

Rugby league
Suniula switched to play rugby league for the Auckland Lions in the 2007 Bartercard Cup, scoring a try in the Grand Final. There he was spotted by Noel Cleal and signed by Manly-Warringah Sea Eagles. Suniula played for Manly in the NRL.

Rugby union

After four years in rugby league, Suniula returned to union with the Chicago Griffins in 2010. The following season he joined RFU Championship side Cornish Pirates, appearing 16 times for the club during the 2011–12 season. Suniula returned to Chicago Griffins the following season before joining his first top flight professional rugby union side when he signed for the London Wasps for the 2013–14 season. He made five appearances for the club during his brief one-year stint. Suniula joined CSM București for the 2015 Romanian Rugby Championship season.

In 2018 Suniola signed for Austin Elite and quickly became team captain, but by 2019 he was semi-retired and was succeeded as captain by Ben Mitchell.

International career
Suniula represented the United States in rugby union from 2008 to 2016 and played 39 tests including four matches in the 2011 and 2015 World Cups.

Personal life
His brothers, Roland and Shalom, have also represented the United States in rugby union. Suniula has been tattooed by internationally renowned artist Steve Ma Ching, who also tattooed rugby players DJ Forbes and Sonny Bill Williams.

References

1982 births
American Samoan rugby union players
Chicago Griffins RFC players
American Samoan rugby league players
Auckland rugby league team players
Manly Warringah Sea Eagles players
Cornish Pirates players
Living people
United States international rugby union players
Rugby league wingers
Sunshine Coast Sea Eagles players
CSM București (rugby union) players
American Samoan expatriate rugby union players
American Samoan expatriate rugby league players
Expatriate rugby union players in England
Expatriate rugby league players in Australia
American Samoan expatriate sportspeople in Australia
American Samoan expatriate sportspeople in England
American Samoan emigrants to New Zealand
United States international rugby sevens players
San Diego Breakers players
Austin Gilgronis players